Quri Kunka (Quechua quri gold, kunka throat, gullet, "gold throat" or "gold gullet", Hispanicized spelling Joricunca) is a mountain in the Peruvian Andes, about  high. It is located in the Puno Region, Azángaro Province, San Antón District. Quri Kunka lies southwest of the mountain Ichhu Muruq'u and northwest of Yuraq Apachita.

References

Mountains of Puno Region
Mountains of Peru